His and Hers or His & Hers may refer to:

Music
 His 'n' Hers, a 1994 album by Pulp
 "His 'n' Hers", a song by Pulp from their 1994 EP The Sisters EP
 His and Hers (album), a 2012 album by Joey + Rory
 "His & Hers" (song), by Internet Money, 2021

Films
 His and Hers (film), a 1961 British comedy
 "His and Hers" (Are You Being Served?), an episode of Are You Being Served?
 His & Hers (1997 film), an American film starring Danny Hoch
 His & Hers (2009 film), an Irish documentary

Literature
His & Hers, a 2020 novel by Alice Feeney

Television
 His and Hers, a 1970s British sitcom starring Tim Brooke-Taylor
 His & Hers (TV series), a 1990 American sitcom that aired on CBS
 His and Hers (Australian TV series), 1971-1972 Australian television discussion show
 His & Hers (ESPN), a sports talk show on American basic cable and satellite television network ESPN2

See also
Him & Her, a British television show
She & Him, an American musical duo
He and She (disambiguation)
Hers (disambiguation)
His (disambiguation)